Shijing Station is a metro station of Guangzhou Metro Line 8, at Shijing Subdistrict, Baiyun District, Guangzhou, Guangdong, China. The station opened on November 26, 2020, with the opening of the northern extension of Line 8.

The station has an underground island platform. Platform 1 is for trains towards Jiaoxin, whilst platform 2 is for trains towards Wanshengwei.
There are 4 exits, lettered A, B, C and D. Exit B is accessible.

Gallery

References

Guangzhou Metro stations in Baiyun District
Railway stations in China opened in 2020